The Ferrari 156/85 was a Formula One car designed by Mauro Forghieri and Harvey Postlethwaite for use by Scuderia Ferrari in the 1985 Formula One World Championship. The number 27 car was driven by Italian Michele Alboreto, while the number 28 car was driven at the first race of the season in Brazil by Frenchman René Arnoux, who then fell out with Enzo Ferrari and was replaced for the rest of the year by Swede Stefan Johansson.

Engine 
The Ferrari Tipo 031/2 V6 turbo engine produced around  during the 1985 season. The exhaust systems were set outside of the vee, opposite to the previous year's 126C4. The turbocharger for each bank was located at the outside of the vee. Thus the intake chambers were located inside the vee.

Racing history 
The 156/85 proved to be fast and reliable in the early part of 1985 but as the season wore on, the Ferraris became increasingly fragile in both qualifying and race trim with numerous engine and turbo failures throughout the season. It was this unreliability that ultimately would cost Alboreto, who actually led the points standings for most of the season, the drivers' championship. Alboreto retired from four of the last five races in 1985 and retired but was classified as 13th due to completing 90% of the race in the other (Spa) allowing McLaren's Alain Prost to win his first championship.

Alboreto drove half a lap of the Brands Hatch circuit on lap 13 of the European Grand Prix with the rear of his car on fire following another turbo failure. He drove the car into the pits and straight to his Ferrari pit, many observers seeing this as his way of showing that the Ferrari's unreliability had cost him the World Championship, which Prost won by finishing fourth in that race. While Alboreto had unreliability, his teammate Johansson finished fifth twice and fourth once with only two retirements in the last five races. 156/85's unreliability also allowed McLaren to overtake them in the points after half of the season, leaving Ferrari as runners up.

Complete Formula One results
(key) (Results in bold indicate pole position; results in italics indicate fastest lap)

References

External list
YouTube video showing Alboreto at Brands Hatch

156 85